Notukeu-Willow Bunch was a provincial electoral division for the Legislative Assembly of the province of Saskatchewan, Canada, located south of Old Wives Lake. Centered on the town of Assiniboia, this constituency was created for the 8th Saskatchewan general election in 1938 by combining the districts of Notukeu and Willow Bunch.

The constituency was dissolved and divided between the districts of Assiniboia-Gravelbourg and Bengough-Milestone before the 18th Saskatchewan general election in 1975. It is now part of the ridings of Wood River and Weyburn-Big Muddy.

Members of the Legislative Assembly

Election results

|-

 
|CCF
|John E. Lidgett
|align="right"|2,859
|align="right"|37.53%
|align="right"|–

|- bgcolor="white"
!align="left" colspan=3|Total
!align="right"|7,618
!align="right"|100.00%
!align="right"|

|-
 
|style="width: 130px"|CCF
|Niles Buchanan
|align="right"|4,176
|align="right"|59.33%
|align="right"|+21.80

|- bgcolor="white"
!align="left" colspan=3|Total
!align="right"|7,038
!align="right"|100.00%
!align="right"|

|-
 
|style="width: 130px"|CCF
|Niles Buchanan
|align="right"|4,048
|align="right"|53.75%
|align="right"|-5.58

|- bgcolor="white"
!align="left" colspan=3|Total
!align="right"|7,531
!align="right"|100.00%
!align="right"|

|-
 
|style="width: 130px"|CCF
|Niles Buchanan
|align="right"|3,663
|align="right"|52.31%
|align="right"|-1.44

|- bgcolor="white"
!align="left" colspan=3|Total
!align="right"|7,002
!align="right"|100.00%
!align="right"|

|-

 
|CCF
|Emil Lautermilch
|align="right"|2,580
|align="right"|39.63%
|align="right"|-12.68

|- bgcolor="white"
!align="left" colspan=3|Total
!align="right"|6,510
!align="right"|100.00%
!align="right"|

|-

 
|CCF
|Albin Frid
|align="right"|2,278
|align="right"|37.00%
|align="right"|-2.63
 
|Prog. Conservative
|Boyd M. Anderson
|align="right"|895
|align="right"|14.54%
|align="right"|–

|- bgcolor="white"
!align="left" colspan=3|Total
!align="right"|6,156
!align="right"|100.00%

|-

 
|CCF
|Hasket M. Sproule
|align="right"|2,193
|align="right"|37.82%
|align="right"|+0.82
 
|Prog. Conservative
|Boyd M. Anderson
|align="right"|946
|align="right"|16.31%
|align="right"|+1.77
|- bgcolor="white"
!align="left" colspan=3|Total
!align="right"|5,799
!align="right"|100.00%
!align="right"|

|-

 
|NDP
|Allen Engel
|align="right"|2,216
|align="right"|44.43%
|align="right"|+6.61
|- bgcolor="white"
!align="left" colspan=3|Total
!align="right"|4,988
!align="right"|100.00%
!align="right"|

|-
 
|style="width: 130px"|NDP
|Allen Engel
|align="right"|2,542
|align="right"|51.90%
|align="right"|+7.47

|- bgcolor="white"
!align="left" colspan=3|Total
!align="right"|4,898
!align="right"|100.00%
!align="right"|

See also 
Electoral district (Canada)
List of Saskatchewan provincial electoral districts
List of Saskatchewan general elections
List of political parties in Saskatchewan
Old Wives Lake
Assiniboia, Saskatchewan
Willow Bunch, Saskatchewan

References 
 Saskatchewan Archives Board – Saskatchewan Election Results By Electoral Division

Former provincial electoral districts of Saskatchewan